Walter A. McDaniel is an American comic book artist who has contributed to titles as Deadpool, Wolverine, Deathlok, Spider-Man, and Batman. He is the founder and CEO of Red Dragon Media (赤龙世漫), a Beijing-based animation studio.

Interviews in China 
- 专访原“漫威”画师Walter A. McDaniel：中国的IP产业正在经历变革，用心做中国本土化IP http://www.xinpianchang.com/e1410?from=weibo

- 36Kr对公司首席创意师专访－－浮华年代的情怀梦 http://www.diyitui.com/content-1434497140.31611956.html

Bibliography

Marvel Comics
 Deadpool #14-23 (title artist)
 Wolverine Annual #1
 Punisher ("Back to School" special)
 Deathlok #16-25 (title artist)
 Gambit Annual #1
 Captain America - Sentinel of Liberty
 Kazar Annual #1
 Spider-Man #255-258
 Annex
 X-Men

DC Comics
 Lobo Annual
 Batman ("Joker's Last Laugh" #3)

Image Comics
 Shadow Hawk #13 and special #1
 The Pact #1-3

Hasbro
 GI Joe (toy design)
 Transformers
 Valor Vs. Venom

Mattel
 Hot Wheels (highway 25)

Knightstone Comics
 Tekken 2
 Tekken Saga, a comic based on the popular Namco fighting game franchise

Other publishers
 Vampirella (cover artist)
 Earth 4 (pencils; Earth 4 is volume 2 of Urth 4 and published by Continuity Comics in 1993)

Midway Games
 Mortal Kombat comic

Endless Horizons Entertainment
 Stark Raven comic

References

External links
ComicVine's page
Complete database of his works

Living people
American comics artists
Year of birth missing (living people)